Sam 'Candles' Wicks (born 14 September 1999) is an Australian rules footballer who plays for the Sydney Swans in the Australian Football League (AFL). He was selected by the Sydney Swans as a Category B rookie from the NSW zone.

Early football
Wicks played junior football for the Manly Bombers and Manly Warringah Wolves. In 2010, Wicks joined the Sydney Swans Academy. In June 2017, Wicks earned a Rising Star nomination in the North East Australian Football League (NEAFL).

AFL career

2020 season: debut
Wicks was elevated to Sydney's senior list in June 2020, alongside teammate Barry O'Connor. In his first game, Wicks picked up 1 goal, 9 disposals, 1 mark and 6 tackles. On his debut, Wicks was involved with a controversy surrounding the material of his boots after  player Isaac Quaynor sustained a large gash on his leg while attempting to tackle Wicks. The steel studs on the boots Wicks was wearing for the match were ruled as non-league compliant. Neither Sydney or Wicks were sanctioned, but were given a warning.

2021 season
Wicks quickly took his performances up a notch from the previous season, averaging 15.3 disposals and 2 goals a game after just three games. He had his breakout performance in Round 3, where he kicked 3 goals and 2 behinds, as well as collecting 21 disposals, in what was to be a game that saw him named best on ground, receiving the 10 AFLCA votes for that round.

Statistics
Updated to the end of the 2022 season.

|-
| 2019 ||  || 45
| 0 || — || — || — || — || — || — || — || — || — || — || — || — || — || —
|-
| 2020 ||  || 45
| 7 || 3 || 1 || 31 || 27 || 58 || 15 || 32 || 0.4 || 0.1 || 4.4 || 3.9 || 8.3 || 2.1 || 4.6
|-
| 2021 ||  || 45
| 22 || 17 || 18 || 143 || 102 || 245 || 65 || 89 || 0.7 || 0.8 || 6.5 || 4.6 || 11.1 || 2.9 || 4.0
|-
| 2022 ||  || 15
| 10 || 4 || 4 || 43 || 48 || 91 || 21 || 25 || 0.4 || 0.4 || 4.3 || 4.8 || 9.1 || 2.1 || 2.5
|- class=sortbottom
! colspan=3 | Career
! 39 !! 24 !! 23 !! 217 !! 177 !! 394 !! 101 !! 146 !! 0.6 !! 0.6 !! 5.6 !! 4.5 !! 10.1 !! 2.6 !! 3.7
|}

References

External links

1999 births
Living people
Sydney Swans players
Australian rules footballers from New South Wales